Justin Wilcox (born March 12, 1979) is an American mixed martial artist currently competing in the Lightweight division of Bellator. A professional competitor since 2006, Wilcox has also competed for Strikeforce, holding a record of 5-3 (1) in the promotion.

Background
Wilcox began wrestling when he was five years old and was talented, continuing in the sport through high school and in college at the Edinboro University of Pennsylvania alongside current UFC Welterweight Josh Koscheck, who was an NCAA Champion. Wilcox himself continued excelling at the collegiate level, becoming an NCAA qualifier as a true freshman and continued competing well after redshirting in his sophomore season, winning several tournaments. However, after being hit with an inadvertent headbutt which may have caused a concussion, Wilcox was preparing for another match when he slipped and knocked himself out when he hit the floor. The concussion, along with multiple bone fractures, were severe enough to end his career. Wilcox had been inspired to compete in mixed martial arts after seeing Koscheck on the first season of "The Ultimate Fighter" and began training in the sport himself. At the time, Wilcox was a professional bodybuilder, winning various contests while also running a gym in Pennsylvania, and weighed 205 lbs.

Mixed martial arts career

Early career
After a shaky 2–2 start to his career, Wilcox moved to train with Koscheck at American Kickboxing Academy as well as dropping down a weight class to compete at Lightweight.

Strikeforce
In his Strikeforce debut, Wilcox fought against Mitsuhiro Ishida and lost by submission (armbar) at 1:21 of the first round.

After that loss Wilcox won three straight fights over David Douglas, PRIDE veteran Daisuke Nakamura and The Ultimate Fighter 13 alumni Shamar Bailey.

On November 19, 2010, Wilcox faced DREAM veteran Vítor Ribeiro in the main event of Strikeforce Challengers: Wilcox vs. Ribeiro. He won the fight via unanimous decision (30-27, 30–27, 30–27).

Wilcox upped his win streak to five with a TKO victory over veteran Rodrigo Damm at Strikeforce Challengers: Wilcox vs. Damm. The fight was stopped by a ringside doctor at the end of the first round due to lacerations above both of Damm's eyes.

Wilcox fought Gesias Cavalcante at Strikeforce: Overeem vs. Werdum. The bout was declared a no-contest after Wilcox was poked in the eye in the second round and could not continue.

In his next fight, Wilcox competed at Strikeforce: Melendez vs. Masvidal against rising prospect Caros Fodor. He lost the fight via knockout in the first round.

Wilcox fought former lightweight title challenger Jorge Masvidal at Strikeforce: Rockhold vs. Kennedy. He lost the fight via split decision.

Bellator MMA
After over a year a way from the sport, Wilcox was signed by Bellator as a last minute replacement for their Season Nine Featherweight tournament. This would mark the first time Wilcox had ever competed as a Featherweight. Wilcox replaced Shahbulat Shamhalaev on just a few days notice and fought against Akop Stepanyan at Bellator 99. Despite losing the first round decisively due to a series of low kicks that visibly injured his leg and hindered his ability to stand and walk, Wilcox mounted a comeback in the second round and won via rear-naked choke submission moving him into the next round of the tournament.

Wilcox faced up and comer Joe Taimanglo in the semifinals at Bellator 103. Wilcox controlled the entire matchup and won via unanimous decision (29-28, 30–27, 30–27).

In the finals of the Featherweight Tournament taking place at Bellator 108, Wilcox fought Top 15 Featherweight, Patricio Freire. Wilcox lost the fight via first-round technical knockout. After the loss Wilcox decided to return to his natural weight class of Lightweight (155 lbs.).

Wilcox returned to Lightweight and faced Jason Fischer on March 28, 2014, at Bellator 114. He won via unanimous decision.

Wilcox faced Daniel Mason-Straus in the main event at Bellator 127 on October 3, 2014. He lost the fight via knockout in the first round.

Personal life
Wilcox and his wife Leslie have a daughter named Natalie.

Championships and accomplishments
Bellator MMA
Bellator Season Nine Featherweight Tournament Runner-Up

Mixed martial arts record

|-
| Loss 
| align=center| 14–7 (1)
| Daniel Mason-Straus
| KO (punches)
| Bellator 127
| 
| align=center| 1
| align=center| 0:50
| Temecula, California, United States
| 
|-
| Win
| align=center| 14–6 (1)
| Jason Fischer
| Decision (unanimous)
| Bellator 114
| 
| align=center| 3
| align=center| 5:00
| West Valley City, Utah, United States
| Returns to Lightweight.
|-
| Loss
| align=center| 13–6–1
| Patrício Freire
| TKO (punches)
| Bellator 108
| 
| align=center| 1
| align=center| 2:23
| Atlantic City, New Jersey, United States
| 
|-
| Win
| align=center| 13–5–1
| Joe Taimanglo
| Decision (unanimous)
| Bellator 103
| 
| align=center| 3
| align=center| 5:00
| Mulvane, Kansas, United States
| 
|-
| Win
| align=center| 12–5–1
| Akop Stepanyan
| Technical Submission (rear naked choke)
| Bellator 99
| 
| align=center| 2
| align=center| 2:20
| Temecula, California, United States
| 
|-
| Loss
| align=center| 11–5–1
| Jorge Masvidal
| Decision (split)
| Strikeforce: Rockhold vs. Kennedy
| 
| align=center| 3
| align=center| 5:00
| Portland, Oregon, United States
| 
|-
| Loss
| align=center| 11–4–1
| Caros Fodor
| KO (punches)
| Strikeforce: Melendez vs. Masvidal
| 
| align=center| 1
| align=center| 0:13
| San Diego, California, United States
| 
|-
| NC
| align=center| 11–3–1
| Gesias Cavalcante
| NC (accidental eye poke)
| Strikeforce: Overeem vs. Werdum
| 
| align=center| 2
| align=center| 0:31
| Dallas, Texas, United States
| 
|-
| Win
| align=center| 11–3
| Rodrigo Damm
| TKO (doctor stoppage)
| Strikeforce Challengers: Wilcox vs. Damm
| 
| align=center| 1
| align=center| 5:00
| Stockton, California, United States
| 
|-
| Win
| align=center| 10–3
| Vítor Ribeiro
| Decision (unanimous)
| Strikeforce Challengers: Wilcox vs. Ribeiro
| 
| align=center| 3
| align=center| 5:00
| Jackson, Mississippi, United States
| 
|-
| Win
| align=center| 9–3
| Shamar Bailey
| Decision (unanimous)
| Strikeforce Challengers: Johnson vs. Mahe
| 
| align=center| 3
| align=center| 5:00
| Fresno, California, United States
| 
|-
| Win
| align=center| 8–3
| Daisuke Nakamura
| Decision (unanimous)
| Strikeforce: Evolution
| 
| align=center| 3
| align=center| 5:00
| San Jose, California, United States
| 
|-
| Win
| align=center| 7–3
| David Douglas
| Submission (rear naked choke)
| Strikeforce: Carano vs. Cyborg
| 
| align=center| 3
| align=center| 3:16
| San Jose, California, United States
| 
|-
| Win
| align=center| 6–3
| Moses Baca
| Decision (unanimous)
| Disturbing the Peace
| 
| align=center| 3
| align=center| 5:00
| Fresno, California, United States
| 
|-
| Loss
| align=center| 5–3
| Mitsuhiro Ishida
| Submission (armbar)
| Strikeforce: At The Mansion II
| 
| align=center| 1
| align=center| 1:21
| Los Angeles, California, United States
| 
|-
| Win
| align=center| 5–2
| Gabe Ruediger
| Decision (unanimous)
| JG and TKT Promotions: Fighting 4 Kidz
| 
| align=center| 3
| align=center| 5:00
| Santa Monica, California, United States
| 
|-
| Win
| align=center| 4–2
| Todd Murphey
| TKO (punches)
| Extreme Challenge 82
| 
| align=center| 3
| align=center| 2:35
| Springfield, Illinois, United States
| 
|-
| Win
| align=center| 3–2
| Allan Lee
| Decision (unanimous)
| Extreme Challenge 77
| 
| align=center| 3
| align=center| 5:00
| Mason, Ohio, United States
| 
|-
| Win
| align=center| 2–2
| Bryce Teager
| Decision (unanimous)
| Extreme Challenge 76
| 
| align=center| 3
| align=center| 5:00
| Sloan, Iowa, United States
| 
|-
| Loss
| align=center| 1–2
| Dan Hornbuckle
| TKO (punches)
| Total Fight Challenge 6
| 
| align=center| 1
| align=center| 1:20
| Hammond, Indiana, United States
| 
|-
| Loss
| align=center| 1–1
| Chad Reiner
| Submission (armbar)
| Extreme Challenge 68
| 
| align=center| 1
| align=center| 2:54
| Hayward, Wisconsin, United States
| 
|-
| Win
| align=center| 1–0
| Bobby Voelker
| Decision (unanimous)
| Extreme Challenge 68
| 
| align=center| 2
| align=center| 5:00
| Hayward, Wisconsin, United States
|

References

External links

American male mixed martial artists
Lightweight mixed martial artists
Mixed martial artists utilizing collegiate wrestling
Living people
1978 births
American bodybuilders
American practitioners of Brazilian jiu-jitsu
American male sport wrestlers
Amateur wrestlers